Hamelin Prison, also known as the Stockhof, was a prison and penitentiary in Hamelin. The penal institution, which had a predecessor since 1698, existed from 1827 to 1980. It was located between the old town and the river Weser. The listed prison buildings are now used as a hotel.

History 
The penal institution dates back to the Stockhof built in 1698, which housed prisoners condemned to build a fortress. The name came from the fact that the prisoners were tied to stocks in their dormitory at night to prevent escapes.

A new prison was built in 1713 because of overcrowding. In 1827 a new building was built on the former site of the Hamelin Fortress directly on the Weser, from which some of the remaining remains of the building originate. There were three wings and outbuildings. This was the Royal Penitentiary, which became a Prussian prison in 1866.

Nazi period 

From 1933, during the Nazi period, hundreds of political prisoners were imprisoned in addition to around 500 criminal prisoners. According to the National Socialist rulers, it was primarily communists and social democrats, but also homosexuals and Jews. In 1935 the outer walls were raised and the institution was converted into a penitentiary. During the Second World War, political prisoners from France and Denmark were added, also as Nacht-und-Nebel prisoners. According to official statistics, 305 prisoners died between 1939 and 1945, 55 of them after their liberation by American troops. At the end of the war, on April 5, 1945, while the city was being shelled, the SS ordered the prison to be evacuated and the camp to be walked to Holzen subcamp, which became a death march along the Iths for many prisoners.

Post-war period 

In the post-war period, the prison was used by the British military government as a place of execution from 13 December 1945 until 1949, with the British executioner Albert Pierrepoint. 156 people were executed as war criminals during this period. Among them were the concentration camp guards Irma Grese, Elisabeth Volkenrath and Johanna Bormann, who were convicted in the Belsen trial, the camp commander Josef Kramer, and the concentration camp doctor Fritz Klein. Other executions due to Allied trials involved the concentration camp doctor Rolf Rosenthal, Hans Körbel and Benno Orendi, Vera Salvequart ( Kapo in the Bergen-Belsen concentration camp), the SS guards Ruth Neudeck, Dorothea Binz, Elisabeth Marschall and Emma Zimmer, the former battalion commander of the 12th SS Panzer Division Bernhard Siebken and Fritz Knöchlein, chief of the 4th Company of the 2nd SS Totenkopf Regiment.

Another 44 people were executed for violating the laws of occupation. Among them were 42 former forced labourers, some of whom were from Eastern Europe. The last execution in Hamelin was on December 6, 1949 on the Pole Jerzy Andziak (a displaced person) for the use of firearms resulting in death.

In 1955 the Hamelin prison was closed and the inmates were transferred to the Justizvollzugsanstalt Celle prison. On October 1, 1958, the prison became a juvenile detention centre, whose prisoners were transferred to the newly established Hameln juvenile detention center in Tündern in 1980. This ended the prison operations. In 1986 the cell building, east and west wings of the facility were demolished. The remaining parts were converted into a hotel, which opened in August 1993.

Political prisoners during the National Socialist period 

 Emil Carlebach, Jewish trade unionist
 Arthur Gerlt, member of the Committee for Proletarian Unity
 Wilhelm Hahn jr, Social Democrat and resistance fighter

 Walter Kramer, communist
 Friedrich Lohmeyer, SPD functionary and resistance fighter
 Wilhelm Muller, communist
 Karl Schinke, Social Democrat
 Peter Schneider, Social Democrat
 Ernst Wesemann, Social Democrat

Executed under British occupation 

 Dorothea Binz, concentration camp guard
 Juana Bormann, concentration camp guard
 Irma Grese, concentration camp guard
 Franz Hößler, SS Hauptsturmfuhrer and detention camp leader
 Gustav Alfred Jepsen, SS Obersturmbannfuhrer
 Fritz Klein, concentration camp doctor
 Fritz Knöchlein, SS Obersturmfuhrer
 Hans Körbel, SS doctor, works doctor at Volkswagen
 Josef Kramer, concentration camp commander
 Günther Kuhl, SS Obersturmbannfuhrer
 Max Pauly, concentration camp commander
 Rolf Rosenthal, SS doctor
 Karl Eberhard Schöngarth, SS Brigadefuhrer
 Bernhard Siebken, SS Obersturmbannfuhrer
 Walter Sonntag, SS Hauptsturmfuhrer, concentration camp dentist
 Bruno Tesch, chemist
 Anton Thumann, SS Obersturmfuhrer
 Elisabeth Volkenrath, concentration camp guard
 Johann Frahm, SS-Unterscharführer at Neuengamme concentration camp

Also, 13 further convicted of murdering the Stalag Luft III escapees on the orders of Hitler, all executed on the same day 27 February 1948.

 Geith, Eduard 		
 Gmeiner, Josef
 Herberg, Walter
 Jacobs, Walter 
 Kähler, Hans
 Post, Johannes
 Preiss, Otto 
 Schimmel, Alfred
 Schmidt, Oskar 	
 Schneider, Johann	
 Schulz, Emil
 Weil, Emil
 Zacharias, Erich

References

External links 

 Hamelin prison during the Nazi era and in the post-war period
 The Stockhof am Langen Wall – prison in Hamelin
 Map of the Hamelin Prison, 1952
 Aerial view of the prison in the early 1960s
 Benjamin Schulz: Parties in the Nazi prison Spiegel online, May 25, 2011

Prisons in Germany
Execution sites